Solitanea is a genus of moths in the family Geometridae erected by Alexander Michailovitsch Djakonov in 1924.

Species
Solitanea mariae (Stauder, 1921) Italy
Solitanea defricata (Püngeler, 1903) Sakhalin, Amur, Primorye, Transbaikalia, Buryatia, Japan, China (Heilongjiang)

References

Solitaneini